The British Hospital or Hospital Británico is a private hospital in Montevideo, Uruguay. It is located in the barrio of Parque Batlle, just west of the park of the same name. It was first established by the British in the Ciudad Vieja under the name Hospital Extranjero (Foreign Hospital) in 1857. It moved to its current location under the current name in 1913; British architect John Adams authored the turn-of-the-century building. 

For more than 40 years it has offered a private health insurance to its members called "British Hospital Scheme".

References

External links
Official site

Hospital buildings completed in 1857
Hospital buildings completed in 1913
Hospitals in Montevideo
British immigration to Uruguay
1857 establishments in Uruguay
Tres Cruces